Chippendales is a touring dance troupe best known for its male striptease performances and for its dancers' distinctive upper body costume of a bow tie, collar, and shirt cuffs worn on an otherwise bare torso.

Established in 1979, Chippendales was the first all-male stripping troupe to make a business performing for mostly female audiences. Through the quality of its staging and choreography, Chippendales also helped legitimize stripping as a form of popular entertainment.

The company produces Broadway-style burlesque shows worldwide and licenses its intellectual property for select consumer products ranging from apparel and accessories to slot machines and video games. The Chippendales perform in a ten-million-dollar theater and lounge built specifically for them at the Rio All Suite Hotel and Casino in Las Vegas. Annually, the men of Chippendales are seen by almost two million people worldwide, performing in more than 25 cities in the U.S., 23 cities in Central and South America, 60 European cities, four Asian countries, and eight South African cities.

History
Chippendales was founded by India-born Somen "Steve" Banerjee. In 1975, Banerjee bought a failing West Los Angeles bar named Destiny II. In 1979, Banerjee renamed the bar  "Chippendales" and began hosting exotic dance nights for women, which became a major hit.

Banarjee opened clubs in New York, Dallas, and Denver, and three touring troupes toured around the US and Europe.

Similar nightclubs soon followed. Banerjee was worried about the competition and attempted to burn down at least three of them.

In 1987, Banerjee hired his close associate Ray Colon to murder his business partner Nick De Noia. Colon later hired Gilbert Rivera Lopez to perform the hit on De Noia. He also plotted to have two other former associates killed. Banerjee was arrested in 1993 for murder for hire, racketeering, and attempted arson, for which he was sentenced to 26 years on a plea bargain. He hanged himself in his cell a year later.

In 2020, the troupe turned their show into workout videos as an alternative form of entertainment/exercise to people in lockdown and quarantine due to the COVID-19 pandemic.

Legal affairs
The company continues to battle similar male revues in the courts. In 1980, Chippendales successfully registered its "Cuffs and Collar" uniform as a trademark in 2003, following an agreement between Hugh Hefner and Nahin that was brokered by Playboy model Dorothy Stratten. However, because this registration was based on "acquired distinctiveness", Chippendales filed a subsequent application for the same mark in an effort to have the mark recognized as being inherently distinctive. The Trademark Trial and Appeal Board affirmed the decision of the examiner that the mark was not inherently distinctive with one member of the panel dissenting. The Trademark Trial and Appeal Board noted that its decision in no way detracted from the rights flowing from the registration in 2003: "However, the fact that the applicant already owns an incontestable registration for the Cuffs & Collar Mark should serve as no small consolation in spite of our decision here."

On October 1, 2010, the U.S. Court of Appeals for the Federal Circuit affirmed the decision of the Trademark Trial and Appeal Board. Nothing in that decision affected the validity of the 2003 registration. One of the reasons for upholding the decision was the testimony of Chippendales' own expert, who admitted the male dancers' outfits were "inspired" by those of the Playboy Bunny, who also feature a bow-tie and shirt cuffs. In April 2011, St. Joseph, Missouri, police shut down a show by a Chippendales impostor group, alleging that it violated Missouri's adult entertainment laws.

Notable dancers and hosts
Former The Bachelor fiancée Vienna Girardi hosted the Chippendales' "Ultimate Girls Night Out" in November 2010. Karina Smirnoff of Dancing with the Stars hosted the following month. Ronnie Magro of Jersey Shore guest hosted an event in February 2011. It was reported that Jeff Timmons would be performing with the group through the summer. In 2012, Joey Lawrence was a dancer for a special engagement in June at the Rio All Suite Hotel and Casino in Las Vegas. Former dancers from the inception of the 1980s Chippendales choreographed show include Michael Rapp, John Bernard Richardson, Dean Mammales, Scott Marlowe, and Jonathan Hagan.

In popular culture
The 1990 Saturday Night Live sketch "Chippendales Audition" featured guest host Patrick Swayze and Chris Farley competing in an audition to become a Chippendales dancer.

In the 1997 English comedy film, The Full Monty, the characters' plan to form a striptease group is inspired by the Chippendales.

Films and TV series based on the real story of Chippendales and its founder Somen Banerjee include the 2000 TV movie The Chippendales Murder, directed by Eric Bross; the 2001 direct-to-video film Just Can't Get Enough, and the 2022 Hulu miniseries Welcome to Chippendales. Others who have attempted to make a film about the Chippendales story include Tony Scott in 2009, producer Alan Ball in 2014, Salman Khan in 2016, and Craig Gillespie in 2017, in a film that would have starred Dev Patel.

The true story of Chippendales has also been the subject of several episodes of true crime series, as well as the 2021 Amazon Prime and Discovery+ four-part documentary series Curse of the Chippendales, written and directed by Jesse Vile.

Literature
 David Henry Sterry: Master of Ceremonies: A True Story of Love, Murder, Roller Skates and Chippendales (Grove Atlantic, 2008)

See also
 Australia's Thunder from Down Under
 Dreamboys

References

External links

 Official Chippendales site USA
 Official Chippendales site Germany
 Obituary of Somen Banerjee
 Image of women watching a performance of male exotic dancers at Chippendales in Los Angeles, California, 1986. Los Angeles Times Photographic Archive (Collection 1429). UCLA Library Special Collections, Charles E. Young Research Library, University of California, Los Angeles.

1979 establishments in the United States
All-male revues
American burlesque performers
Entertainment companies of the United States
Male erotic dance